Craig Anthony Torres (born May 31, 1970 in Stoneham, Massachusetts), is a professional bodybuilder of Italian and Spanish origin.  He has competed in both the NPC and IFBB.

Competitions and titles 

 2010 NPC Masters Nationals, Light-Heavyweight—Did Not Place
 2009 NPC USA Championships, Light-Heavyweight—Did Not Place
 2009 NPC Excalibur Los Angeles, Light-Heavyweight—4th
 2008 NPC New England Championships, Middleweight—2nd
 2008 NPC Nationals, Light-Heavyweight—Did Not Place
 2007 NABBA USA Nationals, Short—2nd
 2007 NPC Team Universe Championships, Middleweight—10th
 2007 NPC Nationals, Middleweight—Did Not Place
 2007 NPC Massachusetts Championships, Middleweight—1st
 2005 IFBB North American Championships, Light-Heavyweight—8th
 2005 NPC Massachusetts Championships, Overall Winner
 2005 NPC Massachusetts Championships, Light-Heavyweight—1st
 2004 NPC Nationals, Light-Heavyweight—10th
 2004 NPC Excalibur Los Angeles, Light-Heavyweight—2nd
 2003 NPC New England Championships, Overall Winner
 2003 NPC New England Championships, Light-Heavyweight—1st
 2003 NPC Nationals, Light-Heavyweight—11th
 2003 NPC Junior Nationals, Light-Heavyweight—7th
 2002 NPC USA Championships, Light-Heavyweight—11th
 2001 NPC Nationals, Middleweight—9th
 2000 NPC New England Championships, Middleweight—1st
 2000 NPC Nationals, Middleweight—11th
 2000 NPC Massachusetts Championships, Middleweight—3rd
 1999 NPC Nationals, Middleweight—14th
 1999 NPC Massachusetts Championships, Middleweight—2nd
 1998 NPC New England Championships, Middleweight—11th
 1997 NPC New England Championships, Middleweight—5th
 1994 NPC Team Universe Championships, Middleweight—12th
 1993 NPC Massachusetts Championships, Middleweight—1st
 1992 ANBC USA Natural Championships, Junior—4th

See also 

List of male professional bodybuilders

References

External links 
 Muscle Memory Competition History
 USA Muscle Repetrope Profile
 NPC Empire States Winner Craig Torres Springboards Into the USA's
 Bodybuilder Craig Torres Gallery on Flex Online

1970 births
American bodybuilders
American people of Spanish descent
American people of Italian descent
Living people
Professional bodybuilders